Dilango Racing, or the Dilango Racing Team, is the first International motor racing team in Sri Lanka. The team was founded by Sri Lankan racing driver, Dilantha Malagamuwa, in 2009 under the "Dilango Racing" name for the 2009 Formula Renault V6 Asia; before that Malagamuwa was racing as an individual building up his racing career.

References

External links
 
 

2009 establishments in Sri Lanka